The Sony Xperia acro S (known as the Sony Xperia acro HD in Japan) is a dust- and water-resistant Android smartphone produced and developed by Sony Mobile Communications.

Hardware 
The phone has a capacitive touchscreen display that measures 4.3 inches with a resolution of 1280 x 720 at 342 ppi with Sony's Mobile BRAVIA Engine reality display. It supports multitouch and is capable of displaying 16,777,216 colours. The camera has 12 megapixels with autofocus and also Exmor R for low-light capturing. It is capable of recording video at 1080p with continuous autofocus, video stabilizer and the phone also features a front-facing camera with 1.3 megapixels capable of recording video at 720p. The device features a 1.5 GHz dual-core Qualcomm Snapdragon processor with 1GB RAM, 16 GB of internal memory, which also supports 32 GB external memory with NFC (Near Field Communication) enabled which can be used with Xperia SmartTags, or for low-value financial transactions, as NFC becomes more widespread in use, with the appropriate applications from Google Play. The device also features a micro USB connector with USB on the Go support and a HDMI port for viewing photos and videos on a TV screen. As a dust- and water-resistant device, it is equipped with a scratch-resistant and shatterproof glass and with a dust- and water-resistant rating of IP57.
The Acro S has a widely known problem of turning off and on at random.

Software 
The phone was released with Android 4.0 Ice Cream Sandwich and is Facebook integrated with the Timescape UI skin added on top of Android. The browser supports HTML, HTML5, XHTML and CSS 3. The phone is also integrated with stereo FM radio with RDS, PlayStation Certified which allows users to play PlayStation Suite games, and is connected to the Sony Entertainment Network, allowing users to access Music & Video Unlimited. The device has WiFi and WiFi hotspot functionality with 4.0 Bluetooth connectivity and is also DLNA certified. Sony has made Android 4.1.2 Jelly Bean firmware available for users to download via Sony PC Companion.

See also
Xperia S
Xperia acro

References

External links
SonyMobile – acro S
Sony Xperia SP & L

Android (operating system) devices
Mobile phones introduced in 2012
acro S